Psychopaths is a 2017 American horror film written and directed by Mickey Keating.  It stars an ensemble cast that includes Ashley Bell, James Landry Hébert, Mark Kassen, Angela Trimbur, Ivana Shein, Jeremy Gardner and Samuel D. Zimmerman. It had its world premiere at the Tribeca Film Festival on April 20, 2017. It was released on December 1, 2017, by Samuel Goldwyn Films.

Premise 
A recently executed murderer's soul possesses and inspires an ensemble of psychopathic killers to attack the city of Los Angeles over the course of one night, crossing each others' paths along the way.

Cast 
 Ashley Bell as an escaped mental patient
 Angela Trimbur as a torturer who targets men
 Mark Kassen
 Ivana Shein
 James Landry Hébert as a strangler
 Jeremy Gardner as a psychopathic cop
 Helen Rogers as a housewife
 Larry Fessenden
 Sam Zimmerman as a contract killer

Production 
Shooting began on February 15, 2016 and concluded by March 2016.  In April, Keating reported that he was editing the film.

Release 
Psychopaths premiered at the Tribeca Film Festival on April 20, 2017. Shortly after, Samuel Goldwyn Films acquired distribution rights to the film. It is scheduled to be released on December 1, 2017.

Reception 
Although praising Keating's ability to avoid retreading previous films, Brad Miska of Bloody Disgusting criticized the lack of characterization and called Psychopaths "a beautiful work of art that's void of any real meaning".  Miska highlighted Trimbur's character and said she should have been the focus of the film.  Michael Gingold of Rue Morgue described the film as a homage to Keating's directorial influences.  Commenting on the acting, Gingold wrote, "More than just a technical exercise, Psychopaths is also a showcase for several different styles of unhinged acting, which is what truly holds the attention."  Gingold concluded with the hope that Bell and Keating will continue collaborating.

References

External links 
 

2017 films
2017 horror films
American horror films
American serial killer films
Films set in Los Angeles
Films shot in Los Angeles
Samuel Goldwyn Films films
2010s English-language films
2010s American films